Piotr Mazur (born December 2, 1982, in Vancouver, Canada) is Polish former professional road bicycle racer. He rode in the 2006 Giro d'Italia, but did not finish.

Major results 

1999
 3rd Overall Tour de la région de Łódź
1st Stage 2
2000
 1st  Time trial, UCI Junior Road World Championships
 1st Overall UCI Junior World Challenge
 1st Overall Tour de l'Abitibi
1st Stage 5
 1st Overall Course de la Paix Juniors
 3rd Overall Coupe du Président de la Ville de Grudziądz
1st Prologue & Stage 2
2003
 1st Lubelski Wyscig 3-Majowy
2004
 1st Young rider classification Tour de Pologne
 2nd Chrono des Nations Espoirs
 3rd Overall Course de Solidarność et des Champions Olympiques
 7th Time trial, UCI Under-23 Road World Championships
2005
 National Road Championships
1st  Time trial
3rd Road race
 1st Glasgow Criterium
 3rd Overall Dookoła Mazowsza
2006
 1st  Time trial, National Road Championships

External links 
Profile at Saunier Duval-Prodir official website

1982 births
Canadian male cyclists
Living people
Sportspeople from Vancouver
Canadian people of Polish descent
Polish male cyclists
Cyclists from British Columbia